The Contest 25 OC (Off-shore Cruiser), sometimes called the Contest 25OC, is a Dutch trailerable sailboat that was designed by Jacques De Ridder as a cruiser and first built in 1982.

The design is a production follow-on to the 1959 Contest 25-1 and the 1974 Contest 25-2, both unrelated designs.

Production
The design was built by Contest Yachts, a brand of Conyplex of the Netherlands. Production started in 1982 and ended in 1985, with about 30 boats completed, but it is now out of production. Production ended as a result of the early 1980s recession.

Design
The Contest 25 OC is a recreational keelboat, built predominantly of fibreglass, with wood trim. It has a 7/8 fractional sloop rig with a deck-stepped mast with no spreaders, wire standing rigging and aluminum spars. The hull has a raked stem, a plumb transom, an internally mounted spade-type rudder controlled by a tiller and a fixed fin keel. It displaces  and carries  of cast iron ballast.

The design has sleeping accommodation for four people, with a double "V"-berth in the bow cabin and two  straight settees in the main cabin. The galley is located on the port side just aft of the bow cabin. The galley is equipped with a two-burner stove and a sink. The head is located just aft of the bow cabin on both sides.

Operational history
In a 2010 review Steve Henkel wrote, "best features: The beam on the Contest is a foot wider than any of her comp[etitor]s. and her freeboard amidships is also relatively high ... Worst features: The Contest’s relatively deep draft (4'11") and fixed fin limit her cruising ground to deep-water territory, and her high PHRF must have been a disappointment to prospective buyers."

See also
List of sailing boat types

References

External links

Keelboats
1980s sailboat type designs
Sailing yachts
Trailer sailers
Sailboat type designs by Jacques De Ridder
Sailboat types built by Contest Yachts